The 1980 USA Outdoor Track and Field Championships took place between June 14–15 at Hilmer Lodge Stadium on the campus of Mt. San Antonio College in Walnut, California. The 20K racewalk was held April 20 in Redmond, Washington. The decathlon was held at Hayward Field, University of Oregon in Eugene, Oregon on June 22–23. This was the first time the meet was organized by the newly formed organization The Athletics Congress (TAC).

In addition to being the National Championship, it was the selection meet to international teams including, in the women's 400 meters hurdles and 3000 meters, for the 1980 World Championships in Athletics.

Results

Men track events

Men field events

Women track events

Women field events

See also
United States Olympic Trials (track and field)

References

 Results from T&FN
 results

USA Outdoor Track and Field Championships
Usa Outdoor Track And Field Championships, 1980
Track and field
Track and field in California
Outdoor Track and Field Championships
Outdoor Track and Field Championships
Sports competitions in California